Eporycta lurida is a moth in the family Xyloryctidae. It was described by Wolfram Mey in 2011. It is found in South Africa and Namibia.

References

Eporycta
Moths described in 2011